Juan Félix (born 9 February 1959) is a Puerto Rican rower. He competed at the 1984 Summer Olympics and the 1988 Summer Olympics.

References

1959 births
Living people
Puerto Rican male rowers
Olympic rowers of Puerto Rico
Rowers at the 1984 Summer Olympics
Rowers at the 1988 Summer Olympics
Place of birth missing (living people)
Pan American Games medalists in rowing
Pan American Games silver medalists for Puerto Rico
Rowers at the 1987 Pan American Games